Acacia hubbardiana, commonly known as yellow prickly moses, is a shrub belonging to the genus Acacia and the subgenus Phyllodineae that is native to parts of north eastern Australia.

The shrub has a distribution along coastal parts of south eastern Queensland between around Bundaberg in the north to south around Brisbane where it is found on coastal plains, swamps and lowlands growing in sandy soils that are poorly drained as a part of open woodland or heath communities.

See also
 List of Acacia species

References

hubbardiana
Flora of Queensland
Plants described in 1969
Taxa named by Leslie Pedley